Martin Jære (9 January 1920 – 18 December 2015) was a Norwegian skier from Oppdal. He competed in cross-country skiing at the 1948 Winter Olympics, where he placed 10th in 50 km.

Cross-country skiing results

Olympic Games

References

1920 births
2015 deaths
People from Oppdal
Norwegian male cross-country skiers
Olympic cross-country skiers of Norway
Cross-country skiers at the 1948 Winter Olympics
Sportspeople from Trøndelag